UTV2 was a television channel, owned by Ulster Television plc (now UTV Media). The channel was on digital terrestrial television and NTL cable in Northern Ireland.

The channel launched on 28 June 1999 as TV You, but was rebranded as UTV2 in 2000. The programming consisted primarily of simulcasts with ITV2, as broadcast in England, Wales and the Scottish Borders, although they did also use archive programmes from UTV.

Unusually, for a commercial station, UTV2 did not carry any advertising. This was presumably due to their failure to attract advertisers to UTV2, which was only receivable by a few thousand viewers.

UTV2 closed on 22 January 2002 following a deal with ITV Digital and was replaced by ITV2.

See also
UTV
ITV2
S2

References

1999 establishments in Northern Ireland
Defunct television channels in the United Kingdom
Mass media in Belfast
Television channels and stations established in 1999
Television channels and stations disestablished in 2002
Television channels in the United Kingdom
Television in Northern Ireland
UTV (TV channel)
2002 disestablishments in Northern Ireland
Commercial-free television networks